Francesca Jean Halsall (born 12 April 1990) is a retired English competitive swimmer who has represented Great Britain at the Olympics, FINA world championships, and European championships, and England at the Commonwealth Games.  She competed primarily in freestyle and butterfly events.

Halsall was the youngest member of the Team England swim squad at the 2006 Commonwealth Games in Melbourne, where she won silver medals in the 4×100-metre freestyle and 4×100-metre medley relays.

She was a member of the European Aquatics Championships 4×100-metre medley relay team that took gold in August 2006 and successfully defended their title in August 2008 in Eindhoven. Halsall won five medals at the 2010 European Championships in Budapest, 2 Golds, 2 Silvers and a Bronze and was a member of the 4x100-metre medley relay team that successfully defended their title for a second time. In winning five medals, she became the most successful British swimmer ever at a single championships.

At the 2010 Commonwealth Games in New Delhi, India, Halsall won a gold medal, with a national record of 26.19 seconds, in the 50-metre butterfly, beating the favoured Australians. In the 100-metre freestyle Halsall was expected to win easily but a bout of illness (Delhi Belly) left her pale and weak and she had to be content with the bronze medal. Just 20 minutes later and despite being almost unable to stand up she returned for the 100-metre butterfly semi finals but failed to make the final.  Later in the Games Halsall recovered enough to win 3 more silver medals in the women's 50-metre freestyle and as part of the 4x100-metre freestyle and 4x100-metre medley relay teams.

Personal life
Halsall was born in Southport and attended St Mary's College, Crosby.

In 2017, Halsall received an Honorary Doctorate from Edge Hill University.

In 2018, Halsall married rugby league star Jon Wilkin.

Swimming career

2008 FINA Short Course World Championships
Halsall won four medals at 2008 World Short Course Championships in Manchester, including 4×100 m freestyle bronze on her 18th birthday. She won the silver medal in the 100 m freestyle behind Marleen Veldhuis of the Netherlands.

2008 Summer Olympics
Halsall represented Great Britain at the 2008 Summer Olympics in the 100 m butterfly, 50 m freestyle, 100 m freestyle, 4×100 m freestyle, 4×200 m freestyle and 4×100 m medley

In the 100 m freestyle final, she placed 8th, at 54.29. She swam a British record of 53.81 which helped the British quartet set a new national record of 3:38.18 in the 4×100 m freestyle.

2009 FINA Long Course World Championships
Halsall competed in 4 events at the 2009 world championships in Rome. She set a championship record for the 100m freestyle in the lead-off leg during the heats, and in the finals swam the lead leg, with Great Britain placing 7th. Halsall placed 5th in the 50m freestyle in a national record of 24.11. In the 100m, she out-touched Lisbeth Trickett of Australia to take silver in a national record of 52.87, with Germany's Britta Steffen winning in a new world record of 52.07. Halsall anchored the 4x100 metre medley relay to 5th place.

2012 Summer Olympics

At the 2012 Summer Olympics in London, Halsall competed in five events. Halsall reached the semi-finals of 100m butterfly, posting a time of 58.52, well off her season's best of 57.56 set in March. Halsall made the finals of the 100m freestyle and 50m freestyle, finishing 6th and 5th respectively. In the 4×100 m freestyle relay Halsall swam the second leg in a split of 53.29, helping the British team to a 5th-place finish. In the final of the 4×100 m medley relay the British team finished 8th, with Halsall providing an anchor leg of 54.08.

2013 FINA Long Course World Championships
Having just missed out on a medal in the 50m butterfly by coming fourth, Halsall successfully gained bronze in the 50m freestyle posting a time of 24.30 seconds. This ended a disappointing drought of medals for Great Britain just one year after the London Olympics, though Halsall was the only swimmer to finish in a medal-winning position.

2014 Commonwealth Games 
At the 2014 Commonwealth Games, Halsall won gold in the 50 m freestyle, setting three new Commonwealth Games records along the way.  She also won the 50 m butterfly in a Games record time.  In the relay events, she helped England to win silver in the 4 × 100 m freestyle and the 4 × 100 m medley.

2016 Olympics 
Halsall competed for Great Britain at the 2016 Summer Olympics, narrowly missing out on a bronze medal in the 50 metres freestyle and helping the GB team to finish 7th in the 4 × 100 m freestyle.

Personal bests and records held

See also
 List of World Aquatics Championships medalists in swimming (women)
 List of Commonwealth Games medallists in swimming (women)

References

External links

 
 British Olympic Association athlete profile 
 British Swimming athlete profile

English female swimmers
Olympic swimmers of Great Britain
Commonwealth Games gold medallists for England
Commonwealth Games silver medallists for England
Commonwealth Games bronze medallists for England
Swimmers at the 2008 Summer Olympics
Swimmers at the 2012 Summer Olympics
Swimmers at the 2006 Commonwealth Games
Swimmers at the 2010 Commonwealth Games
Sportspeople from Southport
Sportspeople from Lancashire
Living people
1990 births
British female freestyle swimmers
World Aquatics Championships medalists in swimming
Female butterfly swimmers
People educated at St Mary's College, Crosby
Medalists at the FINA World Swimming Championships (25 m)
European Aquatics Championships medalists in swimming
World record setters in swimming
Swimmers at the 2016 Summer Olympics
Commonwealth Games medallists in swimming
Swimmers at the 2014 Commonwealth Games
Medallists at the 2006 Commonwealth Games